Rojavanam is a 1999 Indian Tamil-language romantic drama film directed by Selva and produced by Kavithalayaa Productions. The film stars Karthik, Laila and Malavika.

Plot 
Muthu (Karthik) is the favourite employee at Rojavanam, an old age home jointly by two friends (Ravi Kumar and Nizhalgal Ravi) in Ooty. Sindhu (Malavika) is a psychology student staying near to the home who falls in love with Muthu. But Muthu develops a liking towards Roja (Laila), the daughter of his boss, and later learns that the boss and his friend had decided long ago that their children would be married, and this has resulted in the friend's son Siva (Akash)  growing up enamoured of Roja. Roja also has a liking towards Muthu and her father accepts Muthu as his son-in-law, but his friend, angered at this, decides to bulldoze Rojavanam to the ground. Muthu steps in to solve the problem and convinces Roja to marry Siva as per their parents wishes, so that Rojavanam will be saved. Muthu makes Roja understand Siva's love for her and gets them both married. Siva and Roja's parents feel happy and Rojavanam is saved. In the end, Sindhu is married to Muthu.

Cast 

 Karthik as Muthu
 Malavika as Sindhu
 Laila as Roja
 Akash as Siva
 Kuyili as Roja's aunt
 Ravi Kumar
 Nizhalgal Ravi
 M. N. Nambiar
 M. S. Viswanathan
 Manorama
 Ramesh Khanna
 Jai Ganesh
 Kaka Radhakrishnan
 Thalapathy Dinesh
Ragasudha

Production 
The team of the successful tamil film Pooveli (1998) came together to make Rojavanam and chose Karthik to essay the lead role again. Initially the team approached Isha Koppikar to play the lead female role, but her unavailability led to the team casting newcomer Laila. Four songs were shot abroad in France and Geneva, Switzerland.

Jai Akash, a Tamilian of Sri Lankan origin settled in London, sent his modelling photographs to the "Star Search" service run by Suhasini's entertainment portal website TamilTalkies.com during the late 1990s. K. Balachander, when casting a new actor to portray a small role in the film, used the "Star Search" platform and selected Akash to be in the film.

Reception 
Usha Gopalakrishnan, writing for Indolink, called it "real bore". K. P. S. of Kalki wrote that director Selva got an amazing concept about old age home but since love was given too many importance, it felt like thorns hanging from the strung flowers.

Soundtrack 
The soundtrack was composed by Bharadwaj collaborating with the Pooveli team for the second time. Lyrics were written by Vairamuthu and Palani Bharathi.

References

External links 
 

1990s Tamil-language films
1999 films
Films directed by Selva (director)
Films scored by Bharadwaj (composer)